HBI may refer to:
 IATA code "HBI" for Asheboro Regional Airport North Carolina, United States
 Hamengkubuwono I (also known as Raden Mas Sujana), first rule or Yogyakarta, Java between 1755 and 1792
 Hanesbrands, an American clothing company
 Hans-Bredow-Institut, in Hamburg, Germany
 Heartless Bitches International, a website
 Horizontal blank interrupt
 Horizontal blanking interval
 Host-based intrusion detection system
 Hot-briquetted iron, a compacted form of direct reduced iron
 Houston Bible Institute, now the College of Biblical Studies, in Houston, Texas, United States